The Beekeeper is an upcoming American action film directed by David Ayer. The film stars Jason Statham, Jeremy Irons, Emmy Raver-Lampman, Bobby Naderi and Josh Hutcherson.

Cast
 Jason Statham
 Jeremy Irons
 Emmy Raver-Lampman
 Bobby Naderi
 Josh Hutcherson

Production
Principal photography began in September 2022 in the United Kingdom. In October, Statham shot scenes at Tyringham Hall in Tyringham. Filming wrapped that December.

Release
The film will be distributed by Metro-Goldwyn-Mayer in the United States and some international territories and Sky Cinema in the U.K.

References

External links
 

American action films
Upcoming films
Miramax films
Metro-Goldwyn-Mayer films
Films directed by David Ayer
Films with screenplays by Kurt Wimmer
Films produced by Bill Block
Films produced by Jason Statham
2020s English-language films
2020s action films
Films shot in the United Kingdom